The Golden Age of Khmer cinema begins. Of the 13 films listed, 2 films  are in existence, 5 have been remade, and 6 have not yet been remade, :

References
 

1965
Films
Cambodian